NYC refers to New York City, the most populous city in the United States.

NYC may also refer to:

Related to New York City 
 .nyc, a top level internet domain for New York City
 New York City (video game), a 1984 Atari 400/800/XL and Commodore 64 video game
 The IATA code for all New York City-area airports, including:
 John F. Kennedy International Airport (JFK)
 LaGuardia Airport (LGA)
 Newark Liberty International Airport (EWR)
 New York Central Railroad, 1831–1968
 New York City FC (NYCFC), a Major League Soccer club

Music 
 NYC (band), a 2010 Japanese boy band
 NYC (Prince EP), 1997

Songs

 "Akuma na Koi / NYC"
 "NYC" (Interpol song), 2003
 NYC (Kieran Hebden and Steve Reid album), 2008
 "NYC (There's No Need to Stop)", a 2006 song by The Charlatans
 "NYC", a song by Kevin Rudolf from In the City
 "N.Y.C.", a song by Steve Earle from El Corazón
 "N.Y.C.", a song from the musical Annie
 "NYC", a 2013 song by Dido from her compilation album Greatest Hits

Other 
 Youth Development Administration, also known as National Youth Commission, Taiwan
 National Youth Competition (rugby league)
 North York Centre, a district in Toronto
 Northern Yacht Club (established 1824), which became the Royal Northern Yacht Club in 1830, now the Royal Northern and Clyde Yacht Club
 Nazarene Youth Conference, an international convention for high-school age Church of the Nazarene members

See also 
 New York City (disambiguation)
 New York, New York (disambiguation)